Silent Reign of Heroes is the ninth studio album by American southern rock band Molly Hatchet, released on June 16, 1998.

Track listing
 "Mississippi Moon Dog" (Bobby Ingram, Phil McCormack, Andy McKinney) – 3:47
 "World of Trouble" (Ingram, McCormack) – 5:34
 "Silent Reign of Heroes" (Ingram, McCormack) – 8:36
 "Miss Saturday Night" (Mac Crawford, Ingram, McCormack) – 4:06
 "Blue Thunder" (Bryan Bassett, Ingram, McCormack) – 4:03
 "Just Remember (You're the Only One)" (John Galvin, Ingram, McCormack) – 4:35
 "Junk Yard Dawg" (Ingram, McCormack) – 3:35
 "Dead and Gone (Redneck Song)" (Ingram, McCormack) – 3:16
 "Saddle Tramp" (Ingram, McCormack) – 7:18
 "Fall of the Peacemakers" (Dave Hlubek) – 6:56

Personnel 
Molly Hatchet
Phil McCormack – lead vocals, harmonica
Bobby Ingram – guitars, acoustic guitar, slide guitar, backing vocals, producer
Bryan Bassett – guitars, acoustic guitar, backing vocals
John Galvin – keyboards, programming
Andy McKinney – bass, backing vocals
Mac Crawford – drums, percussion, backing vocals

Additional musicians
Tim Donovan - additional keyboards, digital sampling
Rolf Köhler, Victoria Miles, Linda Fields, Pam MacBeth - backing vocals

Production
Kalle Trapp – engineer
Charlie Bauerfeind - mixing
Rainer Hänsel - executive producer, mixing

References

Molly Hatchet albums
1998 albums
CMC International albums
SPV/Steamhammer albums